Gillespie Township is located in Macoupin County, Illinois, United States. As of the 2010 census, its population was 3,882 and it contained 1,831 housing units.

History
Gillespie Township is named for Judge Joseph Gillespie.

Geography

Demographics

Adjacent townships
 Brushy Mound Township (north)
 Honey Point Township (northeast)
 Cahokia Township (east)
 Mount Olive Township (southeast)
 Dorchester Township (south)
 Bunker Hill Township (southwest)
 Hillyard Township (west)
 Polk Township (northwest)

References

External links
City-data.com
Illinois State Archives

Townships in Macoupin County, Illinois
Townships in Illinois